Western Sydney Wanderers Football Club is an Australian professional association football club based in Rooty Hill, New South Wales. They play in the A-League and their home ground is Bankwest Stadium. They have qualified for the AFC Champions League three times, in 2014, 2015 and 2017. They won in their first attempt, defeating Al Hilal SFC 1–0 over the two legged final, becoming the first Australian team to win the tournament. In the other two occasions, they got knocked out in the group stage of the tournament.

After their Champions League win in 2014, they went on to represent the Asian Football Confederation at the 2014 FIFA Club World Cup. They lost to Mexican club Cruz Azul in the quarter finals 3–1 after extra time and in the fifth placed playoff, they lost to Algerian side ES Sétif 2–2 (5–4 on penalties).

Tournaments

2014 AFC Champions League

Group H

Knockout stage

Round of 16 

3–3 on aggregate. Western Sydney Wanderers won on away goals.

Quarter-final 

2–2 on aggregate. Western Sydney Wanderers won on away goals.

Semi-final 

Western Sydney Wanderers won 2–0 on aggregate.

Final 

Western Sydney Wanderers won 1–0 on aggregate.

2014 FIFA Club World Cup

2015 AFC Champions League

Group H

2017 AFC Champions League

Group F

Statistics

By competition

By country

By club

By season

Honours 
 AFC Champions League Champions: 2014

See also 
 Australian clubs in the AFC Champions League

References 

Western Sydney Wanderers FC
Australian soccer clubs in international competitions